Ensuokwe is a village in Abi local government area of Cross River State, Nigeria.

References 

Villages in Cross River State